Pheasant's eye or pheasant's-eye is a common name for several plants with showy flowers and may refer to: 

Adonis, a genus of plants in the buttercup family (Ranunculaceae), particularly
Adonis annua, a plant with bright red flowers
Narcissus poeticus, a species of daffodil